The Scourfield Baronetcy, of The Mote and of Williamston, both in the County of Pembroke, was a title in the Baronetage of the United Kingdom. It was created on 18 February 1876 for John Scourfield, Member of Parliament for Haverfordwest and Pembrokeshire and Lord Lieutenant of Pembrokeshire. The title became extinct on the death of the second Baronet in 1921.

Scourfield baronets, of the Mote and Williamston (1876)
Sir John Henry Scourfield, 1st Baronet (1808–1876)
Sir Owen Henry Philipps Scourfield, 2nd Baronet (1847–1921)

References

Extinct baronetcies in the Baronetage of the United Kingdom